Æschillus (Eskil) Petræus (born 1593 in Grums, Sweden; died 27 September 1657 in Turku, now in Finland) was Bishop of Turku in 1652–1657.

Biography
Petræus was lecturer and Dean of the grammar school in Turku. He was also the first professor of theology at Turku Academy and Rector of the University. Petræus was from the Swedish-speaking part of Sweden, but well versed in the Finnish language. He, among other things, led a Bible Translation Committee and published the first grammar of the Finnish language, Linguae Finnicae brevis institutio in 1649. On 20 October 1652 he was appointed Bishop of Turku and was consecrated on 24 October at the Storkyrkan in Stockholm.

References

1593 births
1657 deaths
Finnish scholars
Finnish lexicographers
Lutheran archbishops and bishops of Turku